Kiril Pandov (25 August 1928 – 21 March 2014) was a Bulgarian football player. Pandov was a left midfielder.
Born in Varna, he played with PFC Spartak Varna and earned 207 caps in Bulgarian first division, scoring 1 goal.

References

External links
 Sport1.bg

1928 births
2014 deaths
Bulgarian footballers
PFC Spartak Varna players
First Professional Football League (Bulgaria) players
Association football midfielders
Sportspeople from Varna, Bulgaria